Yekaterina Borisovna Altabayeva (Russian: Екатерина Борисовна Алтабаева; born on 27 May 1956), is a Russian politician. Member of the Federation Council from the executive authority from Sevastopol, since 2 October 2020, as well as she served as the member from the legislative authority of Sevastopol from 2019 to 2020.

Altabayeva had also served as a member of the Legislative Assembly of Sevastopol and was the chairman from 2016 to 2019.

Biography

Yekaterina Altabayeva was born in Uglich on 27 May 1956 and has lived in Sevastopol ever since.

From 1973 to 1976, she worked as a pioneer leader in the All-Union Pioneer Camp "Artek" named after Vladimir Lenin.

In 1982, after graduating from Simferopol State University. M. V. Frunze, worked at school, as a history teacher, and head teacher for extracurricular educational work.

From 1995 to 2014, she was a senior lecturer at the Department of History and Social Sciences and Humanities at the Sevastopol City University for the Humanities.

On 15 September 2014, Altabayeva was a member of the Legislative Assembly of Sevastopol, elected from single-member constituency No. 2, and became the Deputy Chairman of the Legislative Assembly.

From 22 March to 6 September 2016, she served as Acting Chairman of the Legislative Assembly of Sevastopol.

On 6 September, she was approved as the Chairman of the Legislative Assembly of Sevastopol.

On 14 September 2019, Altabayeva lost the powers of the Chairman of the Legislative Assembly of Sevastopol, as she is appointed to the Federation Council as a member of the legislative authority of Sevastopol for five years. Her successor, Vladimir Nemtsev became the new speaker. On 2 October 2020, the Governor of Sevastopol, Mikhail Razvozhayev, signed a decree on the appointment of Altabayeva to the Federation Council from the executive body of state power of Sevastopol for a period up to 2025.

Scientific activity
She developed a training course "History of Sevastopol and its environs from ancient times to the middle of the 20th century" ("Sevastopol studies").

She is also the author of six educational books on the history of Sevastopol, more than 40 scientific and methodological manuals.

References

1956 births
Living people
United Russia politicians
People from Uglich
Members of the Federation Council of Russia (after 2000)
Tavrida National V.I. Vernadsky University alumni